{{Infobox river
|name=Tabalong River
|image=Sungai Tabalong.jpg
|pushpin_map=Indonesia Kalimantan
|pushpin_map_caption=River mouth location in Kalimantan
|name_other=, {{nobold|Sungai Tabalon}}
|source1=confluence of the Left Tabalong River and Right Tabalong River|source1_location=Tabalong Regency
|mouth=Negara River|mouth_location=Amuntai
|length=|width_avg=|depth_avg=|river_system=Tabalong|tributaries_left=Bentot River; Anyar River}}

The Tabalong River is a river traversing Tabalong Regency, in the province of South Kalimantan, Indonesia.Sungai Tabalong: Indonesia. National Geospatial-Intelligence Agency, Bethesda, MD, USA The river flows into the Negara River. It is a confluence of two tributaries: the Left Tabalong and Right Tabalong rivers.

The river has a length of 45 km, width of 80 meter and average depth of 3.5 meter.

Geography

The river flows in the southeast area of Borneo island with predominantly tropical rainforest climate (designated as Af'' in the Köppen-Geiger climate classification). The annual average temperature in the area is 24 °C. The warmest month is June, when the average temperature is around 26 °C, and the coldest is January, at 22 °C. The average annual rainfall is 2982 mm. The wettest month is December, with an average of 392 mm rainfall, and the driest is September, with 101 mm rainfall.

Use 
The Tabalong River provides a large swamp land, which can be used to grow rice during the dry season. However, during the wet season, the discharge of the river and its tributaries increases so high, that it often threatened the harvest and caused flooding in the nearby villages. Therefore, the local government builds flood gates to control the flow and prevent floods.

The abundance of water during the wet season is actually useful to fill up the pools for fishery.

See also 
 List of rivers of Indonesia
 List of rivers of Kalimantan

References 

Rivers of South Kalimantan
Rivers of Indonesia